In baseball statistics, the basic pitch count estimator is a statistic used to estimate the number of pitches thrown by a pitcher where there is no pitch count data available. The formula was first derived by Tom Tango.

See also
Pitch count
Batters faced by pitcher

References

Pitching statistics